Hubert Ausserdorfer was an Austrian luger who competed in the late 1970s. A natural track luger, he won the bronze medal in the men's doubles event at the 1978 FIL European Luge Natural Track Championships in Aurach, Austria.

References
Natural track European Championships results 1970-2006.

Austrian male lugers
Living people
Year of birth missing (living people)